Chehoûr, Shuhur, or Shhur (Arabic: شحور), is a small town on the Litani River in the Tyre District of Southern Lebanon's South Governorate, some 95 kilometres to the south-west of Beirut, the capital city of Lebanon.

Name
E. H. Palmer wrote that the name Shuhûr meant "mud walls", or "conspicuous part".

History

Ottoman rule (1516-1918) 
In 1596, it was named as a village,  Ishur, in the Ottoman nahiya (subdistrict) of  Tibnin  under the liwa' (district) of Safad, with a population of  48  households, all Muslim. The villagers paid a  fixed tax rate of 25% on  agricultural products, such as wheat, barley, olive trees, goats and beehives, in addition to occasional revenues and a press for olive oil or grape syrup, and a water mill; a total of 3,067 akçe.

In 1710, Sayed Salih ibn Muhammad ibn Sharaf al-Din was born in Chehour. He went on to found a dynasty of Shiite scholars, who would play a key-role in the development of Jabal Amel (modern-day Southern Lebanon) up to today. However, Sayed Salih was persecuted during the campaigns of the Ottoman governor of Sidon, Ahmad Pasha al-Jazzar, who had the Shiite population decimated in brutal purges. One of Sayed Salih's sons was murdered and he himself imprisoned for nine years.

In the first half of the 19th century the Shiite notable Mahmoud Mazyad built a mill on the bank of the Litani River:

In 1881, the PEF's Survey of Western Palestine (SWP)  described it as: "A large village with some good houses, containing about 600 Metawileh; it is situated on a hill, and has a well and cisterns in it. There are figs and olives around."

French Mandate colonial rule (1920–1943) 
Soon after the French colonial rulers proclaimed the new State of Greater Lebanon under the guardianship of the League of Nations represented by France on the first of September 1920, French soldiers razed the village residence of Tyre's Imam Abd al-Husayn Sharaf al-Din al-Musawi in Chehour by setting fire to it.

Educational establishment
The table below provides a comparison of public and private schools locally and nationally. It can be used to assess the distribution of students between public and private institutions both locally and nationally. All data provided on education concerning the 2005–2006 school year. Since the publication of more recent figures we will strive to published online.

References

People from Chehour
 al-Sayyid Yusuf Sharaf al-Din, father of Abd al-Husayn Sharaf al-Din al-Musawi

Bibliography

External links
Survey of Western Palestine, Map 2:   IAA, Wikimedia commons
 Chehour  Localliban: Centre de resource sur le developpement local
https://web.archive.org/web/20100619010329/http://shohour.org/ 

Populated places in Tyre District
Shia Muslim communities in Lebanon